Boungbale is a town in the Bassar Prefecture in the Kara Region of Togo. Nearby towns and villages include Bongbon, Lidialabo, Demon, Diabirdo, and Tipakpane.
 

There are also two other villages in the Prefecture which have the same name. These are located at:
Boungbale 
Boungbale

References

Populated places in Kara Region